Albert Smithson (born 1911, date of death unknown) was an English footballer. He was born in Blackhall, Co Durham. He played for Horden Colliery Welfare, Southampton, Aldershot, Scarborough and Scunthorpe & Lindsey United.

Notes

1911 births
Year of death missing
English footballers
Association football forwards
Darlington Town F.C. players
Southampton F.C. players
Aldershot F.C. players
Scarborough F.C. players
Scunthorpe United F.C. players
English Football League players
People from Blackhall Colliery
Footballers from County Durham